Wilhelm Persson (4 January 1886 – 27 May 1955) was a Swedish swimmer. He competed in the men's 200 metre breaststroke event at the 1908 Summer Olympics.

References

External links
 

1886 births
1955 deaths
Swedish male breaststroke swimmers
Olympic swimmers of Sweden
Swimmers at the 1908 Summer Olympics
Swimmers from Stockholm